Janez Žirovnik (born 30 July 1935) is a former Yugoslav cyclist. He competed in the individual road race and team time trial events at the 1960 Summer Olympics.

References

External links
 

1935 births
Living people
Yugoslav male cyclists
Olympic cyclists of Yugoslavia
Cyclists at the 1960 Summer Olympics
Sportspeople from Ljubljana
Slovenian male cyclists